Rajmahal subdivision is an administrative subdivision of the Sahibganj district in the Santhal Pargana division in the state of Jharkhand, India.

History
As a result of the Santhal rebellion, Act XXXVII of 1855 was passed by the British Raj, and a separate district called Santhal Pargana was carved out of parts of Birbhum and Bhagalpur districts. Santhal Pargana had four sub-districts – Dumka, Godda, Deoghar and Rajmahal. Subsequently, Santal Pargana district comprised Dumka, Deoghar, Sahibganj, Godda, Pakur and Jamtara sub-divisions. In 1983 Deoghar, Sahibganj  and Godda subdivisions were given district status.

Administrative set up
Sahibganj district has two subdivisions: Sahibganj and Rajmahal. Taljhari, Rajmahal, Udhwa, Pathna and Barharwa community development bocks and Rajmahal town are in Rajmahal subdivision.

Sahibganj district has two subdivisions:

Demographics
According to the 2011 Census of India data, Rajmahal subdivision, in Sahibganj district, had a total population of 684,716. There were 349,918 (51%) males and 334,798 (49%) females. Scheduled castes numbered 44,774 (6.64%) and scheduled tribes numbered 123,144 (17.98%). Literacy rate was 41.37%.

See also – List of Jharkhand districts ranked by literacy rate

Police stations
Police stations in Rajmahal subdivision are at:
 Rajmahal
 Barharwa
 Kotalpokhar
 Radhanagar
 Ranga
 Taljhari

Blocks
Community development blocks in Rajmahal subdivision are:

Education
In 2011, in the CD blocks of Rajmahal subdivision out of a total 677 inhabited villages there were 72 villages with pre-primary schools, 392 villages with primary schools, 161 villages with middle schools, 24 villages with secondary schools, 11 villages with senior secondary schools, 3 villages with non-formal education centres, 2 villages with vocational training schools/ ITI, 277 villages with no educational facility.
.*Senior secondary schools are also known as Inter colleges in Jharkhand

Educational facilities
(Information about degree colleges with proper reference may be added here)

Healthcare
In 2011, in the CD blocks of Rajmahal subdivision there were 24 villages with primary health centres, 51 villages with primary health subcentres, 10 villages with maternity and child welfare centres, 3 villages with allopathic hospitals, 10 villages with dispensaries, 8 villages with veterinary hospitals, 4 villages with family welfare centres, 36 villages with medicine shops.
.*Private medical practitioners, alternative medicine etc. not included

Medical facilities
(Anybody having referenced information about location of government/ private medical facilities may please add it here)

References

Sub-divisions in Jharkhand